Anthony Bartholomé (born 10 December 1982) is a French footballer. He played for K.V. Kortrijk in the 2008–09 season.

References

1982 births
Living people
French footballers
Louhans-Cuiseaux FC players
ASOA Valence players
Raith Rovers F.C. players
K.V. Kortrijk players
R.E. Virton players
Association football defenders